The Chieftains 10 is an Irish folk album by The Chieftains. It was released in 1981. The original release was simply titled 'The Chieftains 10'; a reissue on the Shanachie label added the subtitle 'Cotton-Eyed Joe' and had a different cover featuring a photograph of the band.

Track listing
"The Christmas Reel" (3:00)
"Salut a la Compagnie" (3:19)
"My Love Is in America" (4:30)
"Manx Music" (3:38)
"Master Crowley's Reels" (1:30)
"The Pride of Pimlico" (2:04)
"An Faire (The Gold Ring)" (3:38)
"An Durzhunel (The Turtle Dove)" (6:45)
"Sir Arthur Shaen and Madam Cole" (4.00)
"Garech's Wedding" (1:35)
"Cotton-Eyed Joe" (2:15)

Personnel
Paddy Moloney – uilleann pipes, tin whistle
Seán Keane – fiddle
Martin Fay – fiddle, bones
Derek Bell – neo-Irish harp, medieval harps, tiompán
Kevin Conneff – bodhrán, vocals
Matt Molloy – flute, tin whistle

References

1981 albums
The Chieftains albums
Claddagh Records albums
Irish folk music